Thomas F. Lloyd Historic District is a national historic district located at Carrboro, Orange County, North Carolina. The district encompasses 25 contributing buildings developed as housing for textile mill workers associated with the 1910 Thomas F. Lloyd Manufacturing Company. The district's buildings date between 1910 and 1915 and are primarily one- and two-story frame mill worker dwellings.

It was listed on the National Register of Historic Places in 1986.

References

Houses on the National Register of Historic Places in North Carolina
Historic districts on the National Register of Historic Places in North Carolina
Buildings and structures in Chapel Hill-Carrboro, North Carolina
National Register of Historic Places in Orange County, North Carolina